Emma Fillipoff (born January 6, 1986) is a Canadian woman who has been missing since November 28, 2012, last seen in front of the Empress Hotel in Victoria, British Columbia, at the age of 26.

Disappearance 
Emma Fillipoff was last seen in the immediate vicinity of the Empress Hotel in Victoria between 7:15 pm and 8:00 pm on November 28, 2012. She was observed being interviewed by Victoria police. Her red 1993 Mazda MPV was found in the Chateau Victoria parking lot with almost all her belongings in it, including her passport, library card, digital camera, clothes, a pillow, assorted ornaments, laptop, and recently borrowed library books. It is believed she used the van as storage. She spoke with Chateau Victoria staff at 7:00 am on the morning of her disappearance.

In June 2018, a man reported that in the early morning following Fillipoff's disappearance, he had picked up a young woman in distress matching her description in nearby Esquimalt.

Timeline

Pre-disappearance
Fillipoff arrived in Victoria in the fall of 2011 from Perth, Ontario. She had brief employment at the Red Fish Blue Fish seafood restaurant in Victoria's Inner Harbour. Since the work was seasonal, Fillipoff left the job on October 31, 2012. She assured co-workers she would be back in the spring.

In what police believe was preparation to move back to Ontario, Fillipoff hired a tow-truck on November 21. She rented the truck in order to move her Mazda from Sooke to the Chateau Victoria parking garage. Unbeknownst to her family, Fillipoff had stayed at the Sandy Merriman House women's shelter on and off since February. On November 23, Fillipoff was captured on security footage at the Victoria YMCA, entering, then leaving, then entering multiple times as if possibly avoiding someone on the outside.

In the days preceding her disappearance, Fillipoff had phoned her mother in Ontario, asking if she could come home. Each time her tone would quickly change and Fillipoff would then ask her mother not to come. On the final call, her mother became aware that Fillipoff had been staying at the Sandy Merriman House, and even though Fillipoff had asked her not to come, she made plans to fly out immediately. Fillipoff's last words to her mother were, "I don't know how I can face you." Her mother arrived at Sandy Merriman House at about 11:00 pm on the 28th, three hours after Fillipoff had been last seen by police at the Empress Hotel.

Early on the day of November 28, Fillipoff had been captured on a 7-Eleven store video on Government Street purchasing a pre-paid cell phone. The video showed her hesitating in departing the store, seemingly checking the street outside. She returned to the 7-Eleven to buy a pre-paid credit card for $200. Reportedly, she left the Sandy Merriman House at about 6:00 p.m. that day. Soon after, she hailed a taxi and asked to be taken to the Victoria International Airport; however, she soon exited the taxi for lack of adequate fare, even though she had the $200 prepaid card.

Minutes later, Fillipoff was seen walking barefoot in front of the Empress Hotel. An acquaintance of hers, Dennis Quay, called 9-1-1 to say a woman was in severe distress outside the hotel. Victoria police arrived, took Fillipoff's name, and spent 45 minutes speaking with her. Deciding that she was not a threat to herself or anyone else, they released her. Until a report surfaced in June 2018, no one reported seeing her since 8:00 pm that night. Later that evening, police met Fillipoff's mother at Sandy Merriman House; by midnight Fillipoff was classified as a missing person.

Post-disappearance
Initially the police stated that Fillipoff had last been seen "with friends several blocks away on Burdett Avenue between Blanshard and Quadra streets." Investigators explored more than 200 leads, turning up minimal information. Most evidence indicates she was planning to return home to Ottawa, but there was no proof that she ever left Victoria. The cell phone she bought had never been activated.

Fillipoff's credit card was allegedly found on the side of the road near the Juan de Fuca Community Centre, north of where she disappeared. It was found by a stranger, whose use of the card to purchase cigarettes was tracked by police.

Emma Fillipoff's writings
Fillipoff wrote copious poems about her time in Victoria. None of it indicated that she was being stalked. Even though some of it indicated she was depressed, experts who appeared on The Fifth Estate said the writing did not have the hallmarks of suicidal ideation. According to Fillipoff's mother, however, the Sandy Merriman staff claimed that Emma Fillipoff "required both physical and medical intervention."

Unrelated charges against mother and brother
In March 2016, Fillipoff's mother and brother were charged with money laundering, as well as drug and weapons offenses, after an OPP investigation. Shelley Fillipoff insisted the charges had nothing to do with the disappearance of Emma Fillipoff, saying "the one has nothing to do with the other."

In November 2016, all charges were dropped against Shelley Fillipoff, clearing her of any involvement.

Leads 

The Campbell River Courier-Islander newspaper reported in May 2014 that Gastown, Vancouver, business owners Joel and Lori Sellen witnessed a man in their store throwing out a $25,000 missing persons reward poster for Fillipoff. The pair reported that the man said, "It's one of those missing persons posters, except she's not missing, she's my girlfriend and she ran away 'cause she hates her parents." The owners immediately called the police. Although security video captured an image of the man, he is yet to be identified as of 2022.

In the summer of 2018, a witness named William came forward with new information about encountering a woman the morning after Fillipoff's disappearance.  The woman matched her general description and demeanor. The report resulted in the organization of a search of the View Royal area of Victoria in December 2018. The search turned up no additional clues, but another search was planned for 2019. Victoria media drew information from Kimberly Bordage's podcast, The Search for Emma Fillipoff.

On November 29th, 2021, the ninth anniversary of her disappearance, police released additional images of Emma as well as pictures of art that she created hoping it would create new leads. In November 2022, police released an age-progression image of Fillipoff, again in hopes of generating new leads.

Media coverage
Emma Fillipoff's disappearance has received extensive print/web coverage both in Canada and abroad.

In 2013, Fillipoff's disappearance was the subject of an episode of the Canadian Broadcasting Corporation television program, The Fifth Estate titled 'Finding Emma'.

In 2017, her case was profiled on the podcast The Vanished.

In 2020, Emma Fillipoff's disappearance was the subject of a long form series by the Canadian audio documentary series The Night Time Podcast titled 'Emma Fillipoff is Missing'. This series features interviews with her mother Shelley, many of her closest friends, and the one time suspect Julien. This series was the featured podcast on Apple Podcasts for the week of January 12, 2020 and appeared in the top ten of Canada's podcast charts for several days.

In November 2022 a trailer was released for a docuseries following Emma's case, titled Barefoot in the Night: The Search for Emma Fillipoff, spearheaded by her mother, Shelley, and director and producer Kimberly Bordage. A release date for the film is yet to be announced.

See also 
List of people who disappeared

References

External links
Detailed timeline of last sightings
Find Emma Fillipoff's facebook page
The Search for Emma Fillipoff with Kimberly Bordage

1986 births
2010s missing person cases
2012 in British Columbia
Missing person cases in Canada
November 2012 events in Canada
Possibly living people
Women in British Columbia
Victoria, British Columbia